is a Japanese television miniseries produced by Tsuburaya Productions as a spin-off of Ultraman Orb. This miniseries is released on April 15, 2017, aired during the ending segment of Ultraman Zero: The Chronicle programming block on TV Tokyo. At the end of the series, it features the debut of the titular character of Ultraman Geed.

Synopsis

As a successor to the Reionics, Reibatos tries to fulfill both Alien Rayblood and Ultraman Belial's failed legacy by reviving an army of monsters and conquer the universe. Meanwhile, Orb deals with a Demaaga on Earth and used the power of Ultraman Ginga and Ultraman X as Lightning Attacker to destroy it. After eliminating both of them, Orb decided to assist Zero in his investigation before Reibatos greeted them. He revives six monsters, Vict Lugiel, Hyper Zetton, King Joe, Gudon, Twin Tail and Birdon as distractions for the two before leaving. After dealing with two of them, Zero sent Orb to chase Reibatos before his father Seven, Zoffy and Ultraman Jack arrive to his aid. Orb stopped Reibatos in the midway and managed to deal fatal blow but the villain simply shrugs it off due to his regenerative ability. Through his words, Zoffy deduced that he is trying to pursue the Giga Battle Nizer in the Monster Graveyard and leaves with Jack while Orb received a special training in Zero's subspace dimension, .

After regaining the Giga Battle Nizer, Reibatos revived Tyrant for Jack and Zoffy to fight as he try to revive an army of 100 monsters. After training for 10 years, Orb was acknowledged by Seven and being granted his Ultra Fusion Card. Guided by the visions he received before, Orb used it in conjunction with Zero and transform into Emerium Slugger. The three raced towards the Monster Graveyard and quickly defeated Tyrant with their combined attacks. Zero transported Orb to Reibatos' realm and the Ultra quickly unleashed an all-out attack to prevent his regeneration before he finally delivers the finishing blow. In the Land of Light, Orb received congratulation for his assistance in the mission and was offered the Star Marks and a place in the Space Garrison for his bravery but politely refused due to his nature as a wanderer. As he left, Zero still wonders of the Giga Battle Nizer's disappearance and keeps this as a secret from anyone.

Meanwhile, Reibatos survived his apparent destruction and try to revive Ultraman Belial in hopes of fulfilling his revenge but fails and discovered that his predecessor is still alive. Rebatos then finds himself killed off by a mysterious figure whose appearance astonished him.

Production
Ultra Fight Orb was teased during the initial announcement of Ultraman Zero: The Chronicle, appearing at the very corner of the biography series' advertising poster. The full news of the miniseries was announced on February 20, 2017 by Tsuburaya themselves.

Although original DVD is slated to be released on December 22, 2017, Bandai Visual collaborates with Premium Bandai for the pre-order exclusive Blu-Ray release of Ultra Fight Orb. Said package is sold at 5,378 yen and bundled with a transparent figure of Reibatos while pre-orders can be made from May 12, 2017 before delivery in September.

Cast
/: 
: 
: 
: 
: 
:

Songs
Insert theme

Lyrics: 
Composition & Arrangement: 
Artist: , 

Lyrics & Composition: 
Arrangement: Toshihiko Takamizawa with 
Artists:  with 

Ending theme
"Shine your ORB"
Lyrics: TAKERU and Chiaki Seshimo
Composition & Arrangement: 
Artists: Voyager feat. Gai Kurenai (Hideo Ishiguro) & SSP (Miyabi Matsuura, Naoto Takahashi and Hiroaki Nerio)
The ending song is only available on Blu-Ray purchase of Ultra Fight Orb.

Notes

References

See also
Ultraman Orb
Ultraman Geed

External links
Ultraman Zero The Chronicle at TV Tokyo 

2017 Japanese television series debuts
Ultra television series
TV Tokyo original programming